A dormant commission is a commission in a Commonwealth realm that lies dormant or sleeping until it is triggered by a particular event.

Historically, a dormant commission was given in relation to a military command. During the Crimean War, Sir George Cathcart held a dormant commission to take command of the British Army in Crimea if Lord Raglan was killed or disabled.

In Australia, Section 4 of the Constitution allows the King to appoint an administrator to carry out the role of Governor-General when there is a vacancy. The Governors of the Australian states, by convention, are given dormant commissions to act as Administrator of the Commonwealth in the absence of a Governor-General. By convention, the longest-serving state Governor exercises the dormant commission, allowing an assumption of office to commence immediately whenever a vacancy occurs and as long as it exists. For example, when Peter Hollingworth stood aside as Governor-General in May 2003, Tasmanian Governor Sir Guy Green was appointed Administrator until Hollingworth's permanent replacement (Major-Gen Michael Jeffery) was appointed and sworn in. The Australian government can advise the Monarch to revoke any Governor's dormant commission. For example, the dormant commission of Sir Colin Hannah, the then Governor of Queensland, was revoked in 1975 after he made political statements which did not find favour with the government. Proposed constitutional amendments to enact a republic (voted down in 1999) made "the longest-serving State Governor available" an Acting President in the event of vacancy or incapacitation.
In New Zealand, the Chief Justice of New Zealand holds a dormant commission to act as Administrator of the Government in the absence of a Governor-General of New Zealand. Other Commonwealth realms use dormant commissions in similar ways.

In the Union of South Africa, a dormant commission was held by the Chief Justice of South Africa when the position of Governor-General of South Africa was vacant – which was the case between 1943 and 1945, when Nicolaas Jacobus de Wet was installed, and in 1959 and 1961, when L. C. Steyn was installed.

In the British Virgin Islands, the Deputy Governor of the British Virgin Islands has a dormant commission to act as Governor of the British Virgin Islands when there is either a vacancy or when the Governor is either ill or temporarily absent from the British Virgin Islands. Other British Overseas Territories also have Deputy Governors, who also hold dormant commissions as well for the same reasons.

In South Africa between 1961 and 1984, the South African Constitution of 1961 gave a dormant commission to the President of the Senate of South Africa to be invoked as Acting State President of South Africa when there was a vacancy in the office of State President, which was often the case between 1967 and 1979.

References

British Overseas Territories
Commonwealth realms
Governance of the British Empire
Government of Australia
Government of Canada
Government of New Zealand
Government of South Africa
History of the Commonwealth of Nations